Karatobe (Qaratöbe), formerly Lenino, is a selo in Karasay District of Almaty Region, in south-eastern Kazakhstan.

References

Populated places in Almaty Region